This is a list of Malaysian films produced and released in 2017. Most of these films are produced in the Malay language, but there also a significant number of them that are produced in English, Mandarin, Cantonese and Tamil.

2017

January – March

April – June

July – September

October – December

References

External links
Malaysian film at the Internet Movie Database
Malaysian Feature Films Finas
Cinema Online Malaysia

Malaysia
2017
2017 in Malaysia